Momentum is a 2005 studio album by American jazz saxophonist Joshua Redman's Elastic Band. The album was released on 24 May 2005 by Nonesuch label. All compositions are original works by Redman unless otherwise noted.

Reception
Matt Collar of Allmusic wrote "Once again featuring the expansive keyboard talents of Sam Yahel, saxophonist Joshua Redman's Momentum features more of the '70s-influenced jazz the former "young lion" experimented with on 2002's Elastic. Bringing to mind works by such iconic artists as Miles Davis, Herbie Hancock, and especially Eddie Harris, Redman digs into sundry groove-oriented tracks such as the driving and punchy "Sweet Nasty," which finds Yahel and Redman soloing hard over drummer Jeff Ballard's James Brown-ready dance beat." John L. Walters of The Guardian commented, "...Momentum, a studio album by the Joshua Redman Elastic Band, marks a determined move towards juxtaposing jazz with funk, rock, hip-hop and studio-based experimentation, building on his basic trio of sax, keyboards and drums." Jeff Simon in his review for The Buffalo News observed, "It isn't that Redman's Elastic Band couldn't figure out freer and merrier ways to groove its way into future hip-hop samples (exploration is not exactly a bugaboo with them), it's just that at the moment, a motherlode of instrumental talent seems to be going into rhinestones and zircons."

In the 48th Annual Grammy Awards, this album was nominated for Best Contemporary Jazz Album.

Track listing

Personnel
Musicians
 Joshua Redman – tenor saxophone, keyboards
 Sam Yahel – keyboards
 Nicholas Payton – trumpet (track 12)
 Stefon Harris – vibraphone (tracks 8 & 9)
 Peter Bernstein – guitar (tracks 11 & 12)
 Eric Krasno – guitar (track 7)
 Jeff Parker – guitar (track 6)
 Kurt Rosenwinkel – guitar (track 9)
 Flea – bass guitar (tracks 5, 10, 11)
 Meshell Ndegeocello – bass guitar (track 7)
 Jeff Ballard – drums (tracks 1, 2, 4, 8, 9, 13)
 Brian Blade – drums (tracks 3, 5-7, 10, 11)
 Questlove – drums (track 12)

Production
Joshua Redman – producer
Sam Yahel – producer
Paul Boothe – co-producer, engineer (mixing)
Andy Sarroff – assistant engineer (mixing)
Greg Calbi – engineer (mastering)

Dana Watson – A&R administration
Wayne Sharp – project coordination
John Gall – design
Michel Wilson – photography

References

External links
 

Joshua Redman albums
2005 albums